Agnes of God is a 1985 American neo-noir mystery film directed by Norman Jewison and starring Jane Fonda, Anne Bancroft and Meg Tilly. It was written by John Pielmeier, based on his 1979 play of the same name. The plot is about a novice nun (Tilly) who gives birth and insists that the dead child was the result of a virginal conception. A psychiatrist (Fonda) and the mother superior (Bancroft) of the convent clash during the resulting investigation.

Despite generally mixed reviews from critics, the film was nominated for Academy Awards for Best Actress in a Leading Role (Bancroft), Best Actress in a Supporting Role (Tilly), and Best Original Score. Tilly also won the Golden Globe for Best Supporting Actress.

Plot
In a Roman Catholic convent in Montreal, Quebec, Canada, during evening prayers, the nuns hear screams coming from the room of Sister Agnes, a young novice. Agnes is found in her room bleeding profusely, and in a  basket, Mother Superior Miriam finds a dead infant.

Sister Agnes is suspected of killing the baby, so psychiatrist Martha Livingston is assigned by a court to determine if she is competent to stand trial. In an interview, Agnes claims she does not remember being pregnant or giving birth, and shows a lack of understanding of how babies are conceived. Mother Miriam tells Livingston that Agnes is an "innocent" who was kept at home by her mother and knows nothing about the world. She is desperate to keep Agnes naive, and declares that she could not have known what pregnancy was or remember the father.

Mother Miriam tells Livingston about the time Agnes stopped eating in the belief she was getting fat, and then exhibited stigmata in her hand that healed itself within a day. Agnes tells Livingston of her friendship with Sister Marie-Paul, the oldest nun, who showed her a "secret place" – a bell tower, which she then shows Livingston. They argue about Agnes' mother and birth, and how much Agnes knows about sex and pregnancy.

Mother Miriam tells Livingston that Agnes must have conceived on January 23, because that is the night Agnes burned her bedsheets confessing they were "stained". While looking around the convent grounds, Livingston comes across a barn. She and a young Monsignor argue about whether her lack of faith will leave her unable to treat Agnes with dignity. Livingston learns that Agnes' mother was verbally and sexually abusive, telling her she was a "mistake"; and that Agnes is Mother Miriam's niece.

Livingston receives permission from the court to hypnotize Agnes, but Mother Miriam is strongly against it, believing it will strip her of her innocence. While hypnotized, Agnes admits she gave birth and that another woman in the convent knew she was pregnant, but will not reveal who. Livingston discovers that a workroom in the convent has a concealed staircase to a tunnel leading to the barn. (A historian explains that many old convents have "secret" tunnels, to let the nuns move between buildings during the winter.) Mother Miriam tries to have Livingston removed from the case, but she appeals to the court authorities and is retained.

Livingston obtains a second court order to put Agnes under hypnosis again. Mother Miriam admits that she knew Agnes was pregnant and put the wastebasket in her room, but denies she killed the baby. Under hypnosis, Agnes reveals that on the night Sister Marie-Paul died, she told Agnes she had seen "Him" from the bell tower and directed Agnes to meet "Him" in the barn. Under questioning, she appears to describe an encounter with a real presence – human or divine. Suddenly, Agnes exhibits stigmata in her hands, and begins bleeding profusely. Agnes declares that "He" raped her, and that she hates God for it. She admits that Mother Miriam was present when the baby was born, but then left briefly; whereupon Agnes killed the child believing that, like herself, the baby was a "mistake".

Agnes is found not guilty by reason of insanity and returned to the convent where a doctor can "visit" periodically. She tells the judge that she heard "Him" singing beneath her bedroom window for six nights in a row, and then on the seventh night he lay on top of her, implying that she may have been raped and impregnated by a trespasser.

Cast
Jane Fonda as Dr. Martha Livingston
Anne Bancroft as Mother Miriam Ruth (religious name) | Anna Maria Burchetti (birth name)
Meg Tilly as Sister Agnes Devereaux 
Anne Pitoniak as Mrs. Livingston, the mother of Martha
Winston Rekert as Det. Langevin
Gratien Gélinas as Father Martineau
Guy Hoffman as Justice Joseph Leveau
Gabriel Arcand as Monsignor
Françoise Faucher as Eve LeClaire
Jacques Tourangeau as Eugene Lyon
Janine Fluet as Sister Marguerite
Deborah Grover as Sister Anne 
Michele George as Sister Susanna
Samantha Langevin as Sister Jeannine
Jacqueline Blais as Sister David Marie
Françoise Berd as Sister Thérèse
Mimi D'Estée as Sister Elizabette
Rita Tuckett as Sister Sister Geraldine
Lillian Graham as Sister Madeline Marie
Norma Dell'Agnese as Sister Geneviève
Muguette Moreau as Sister Luke
Janice Bryan as Sister Mary Joseph
Agnes Middleton as Sister Paul

Filming
Agnes of God was filmed at the former Rockwood Academy in Rockwood, Ontario, Canada and mainly in Montreal, also in Boucherville on the south shore of Montreal (Sainte-Famille church).

Reception
Agnes of God was greeted with mixed reviews upon release in 1985 and has a rating of 42% on Rotten Tomatoes based on 31 critics. Reviewers praised the performances of Tilly and Bancroft, but felt that there were holes in the plot and movement. Gene Siskel said that it played "with some challenging ideas and some sensationalistic events, but ultimately it fails to earn its right to toy with such subjects." Roger Ebert similarly sided, giving it one star and saying that though it "deals in the basic materials of a criminal investigation (cynical cops, forensic details, courtroom testimony), it has a seriously clouded agenda."

The film was a modest financial success, as it grossed $25,627,836 domestically.

Awards and nominations

References

External links
 
 
 
 
 
 Transcript of the film

1985 films
1980s mystery drama films
American neo-noir films
American mystery drama films
Columbia Pictures films
Films scored by Georges Delerue
Films about Catholic nuns
Films about psychiatry
American films based on plays
Films directed by Norman Jewison
Films featuring a Best Supporting Actress Golden Globe-winning performance
Films set in Montreal
Films shot in Montreal
Films shot in Ontario
1985 drama films
1980s English-language films
1980s American films